Emmanuil Gedeonovich Vitorgan (born 27 December 1939) is a Soviet, Russian film and theater actor, Honored Artist of the RSFSR (1990). People's Artist of Russia (1998). He acted in over a hundred films.

Personal life 
First wife —  actress Tamara Rumyantseva (born in 1936), the marriage broke up in 1970.
Daughter Ksenia Rumyantseva.
Grandchildren —  Alexander and Nikita. Great-grandchildren - Mark and Alisa.
 Second wife —   actress Alla Balter (1939-2000).
Son Maxim (1972) —  film and theater actor, married to Ksenia Sobchak.
Grandchildren —  Polina, Daniil and Platon.
 Third wife —  Irina Mlodik (born in 1962).
Daughter Ethel (2018).
Daughter Klara (2019).

Selected filmography 
 1960 — A Man with the Future as miner
 1971 — King Lear as servant / Edgar (voice)
 1980 — Star Inspector as Douglas Kober
 1982 — Charodei as Viktor Kovrov
 1983 — Anxious Sunday as Igor Chagin
 1985 — Battle of Moscow as Yefim Fomin
 1990 — Frenzied Bus as Mr. Anouk, a member of the Israeli Foreign Ministry
 1991 — Anna Karamazoff as Prokudin-Gorsky, director
 1992 — Weather Is Good on Deribasovskaya, It Rains Again on Brighton Beach as Jack
 2003 / 2004 — Poor Nastya as Prince Pyotr Dolgoruky
 2004 — Children of the Arbat as Sergey Spigelglas 
 2004 — Neznayka and Barrabass  as Barrabass
 2008 — Radio Day as Emmanuil Gedeonovich, owner of radio station
 2010 — Sea Rex (Russian voice)
 2011 — Svaty (TV) as Alexander Berkovich
 2012 — Sklifosovsky (TV) as Mikhail Breslavets
 2014 — Black Rose as Colonel Gromov
 2014 — Yolki 1914 as Alexey Trofimovich
 2016 — Friday as Sergei Dubravin

References

External links

Soviet male film actors
Soviet male stage actors
Actors from Baku
1939 births
Russian male film actors
Russian male stage actors
People's Artists of Russia
Russian male voice actors
Soviet Jews
Living people
Honored Artists of the RSFSR
Jewish Russian actors
Audiobook narrators